

Canadian Football News in 1936
Teams were restricted to a maximum of five imports, and only players who had lived in Canada for a full year could compete in the Grey Cup game. When Regina won the West, five of their imports were declared illegal by the Canadian Rugby Union (CRU). Regina offered to drop the players for the Grey Cup, but the CRU would not allow them to play for the cup. Instead, the Grey Cup was a contest between the Sarnia Imperials of the Ontario Rugby Football Union (ORFU) and the Ottawa Rough Riders of the Interprovincial Rugby Football Union (IRFU). Sarnia won their second and last Grey Cup with a powerful line-up that included future Hall of Famers Hugh (Bummer) Stirling and Ormond Beach.

The Western Interprovincial Football Union (WIFU) was formed in August with the Winnipegs, Calgary Bronks, and the Regina Roughriders.

The IRFU and WIFU adopted a two-game point series format for the playoffs. The series was played between first and second place teams.

A white ball was used in games played under floodlights in Western Canada.

Intercollegiate teams stopped competing for the Grey Cup.

The Regina Roughriders fielded two teams; the main, or "big" team in the WIFU, and the "little" Roughriders who played in the last SRFU season.

The Calgary Bronks played a full schedule in the Alberta Rugby Football Union including some games which conflicted with the WIFU schedule. For the open dates, the Bronks fielded the same team that was competing in the WIFU (5 games). For the remaining three games, the Bronks fielded a second team which was referred to as the Calgary Bronks 'B'. 
The final game of the regular season saw the Calgary Bronks square off against the University of Alberta Golden Bears. These teams were the two top teams in the ARFU, so it was decided that in addition to being the final regular season game, the game would also determine the ARFU championship.

Regular season

Final regular season standings
Note: GP = Games Played, W = Wins, L = Losses, T = Ties, PF = Points For, PA = Points Against, Pts = Points

Bold text means that they have clinched the playoffs.

Grey Cup playoffs
Note: All dates in 1936

BCRFU tie-breaker playoff

Vancouver Athletic Club Wolves win BCRFU and advance (only to default.)

Division semi-finals

Regina won the total-point series 24–14 after Winnipeg started the series with a 2-0 lead.

 Game to be played on Nov.7 in Winnipeg, but Moose Jaw Millers withdraw on Nov. 5 and Regina advances to Final

 BCRFU forfeits game, Calgary Bronks "B" side advance to final.

Division finals

Regina started the game with a 5-0 lead.The Calgary Daily Herald - Nov 10, 1936 CRU would not allow them to play for the Grey Cup

Sarnia advanced to the Grey Cup game.

Ottawa won the total-point series 22–6 and advanced to the Grey Cup game.

Grey Cup Championship

1936 Eastern (Combined IRFU & ORFU) All-Stars  selected by Canadian Press
NOTE: During this time most players played both ways, so the All-Star selections do not distinguish between some offensive and defensive positions.
1st Team
QB – Bob Coulter, Toronto Argonauts
FW – Ormond Beach, Sarnia Imperials
HB – Hugh Welch, Hamilton Tigers
HB – Ab Box, Toronto Argonauts
DB – Ted Morris, Toronto Argonauts
E  – Wes Cutler, Toronto Argonauts
E  – Seymour Wilson, Hamilton Tigers
C  – Fred Wigle, Montreal Indians
G – Charles "Tiny" Hermann, Ottawa Rough Riders
G – George Pigeon, Montreal Indians
T – Dave Sprague, Ottawa Rough Riders
T – Pete Joktus, Montreal Indians2nd Team
QB – Arnie McWatters, Sarnia Imperials
FW – Abe Eliowitz, Ottawa Rough Riders
HB – Andy Tommy, Ottawa Rough Riders
HB – Mike Hedgewich, Sarnia Imperials
DB – Hugh Sterling, Sarnia Imperials
E  – Jack Holden, University of Toronto
E  – Syd Reynolds, Toronto Balmy Beach Beachers
C  – George Willis, University of Western Ontario
G – Pat Butler, Sarnia Imperials
G – George Hornig, McGill University
T – Ernie Hempey, Toronto Balmy Beach Beachers
T – Gus Greco, University of Toronto

1936 Canadian Football Awards
 Jeff Russel Memorial Trophy (IRFU MVP) – Arnie Morrison (QB), Ottawa Rough Riders
 Imperial Oil Trophy (ORFU MVP) - Syd Reynolds - Toronto Balmy Beach Beachers

References

 
Canadian Football League seasons
Grey Cups hosted in Toronto